Disguise in Love is the second studio album by John Cooper Clarke, first released in 1978. (It followed  Ou est la maison de fromage?). Most of the tracks are spoken over musical accompaniment provided by Clarke's band The Invisible Girls, except "Psycle Sluts 1&2" and "Salome Maloney" — both live recordings from the Ritz Ballroom in Manchester on 8 May 1978, delivered in his trademark a cappella style.

Track listing 
All tracks written by John Cooper Clarke, Martin Hannett and Steve Hopkins except where noted
"I Don't Wanna Be Nice" – 3:50
"Psycle Sluts 1&2" (Clarke) – 3:12
"(I've Got a Brand New) Tracksuit" – 1:51
"Teenage Werewolf" – 3:57
"Readers Wives" – 3:13
"Post War Glamour Girl" – 3:35
"(I Married a) Monster from Outer Space" – 3:32
"Salome Maloney" (Clarke) – 2:08
"Health Fanatic" – 5:42
"Strange Bedfellows" – 4:10
"Valley of the Lost Women" – 4:19

Charts

Personnel 
John Cooper Clarke – vocals
The Invisible Girls
Paul Burgess – drums, percussion
Martin Hannett – bass guitar, synthesizer programming
Steve Hopkins – keyboards, synthesizer programming
with:
Lyn Oakey – guitar (tracks 4, 5, 6, 10)
Bill Nelson – guitar (tracks 1, 5, 9)
John Scott – guitar (track 3)
Pete Shelley – guitar (tracks 1, 4, 7, 10)
Technical
Laurence Diana - mixing engineer
Dave Kent-Watson, Phil Bush - recording engineer
Steve Maguire - cover painting
Peter Gravelle - photography

References

External links 
Lyrics and liner notes

John Cooper Clarke albums
1978 albums
Albums produced by Martin Hannett
CBS Records albums